Little gastrin I is a form of gastrin commonly called as gastrin-17. This is a protein hormone, secreted by the intestine.

Gastrin II has identical amino acid composition to Gastrin I, the only difference is that the single tyrosine residue is sulfated in Gastrin II.

References

Peptide hormones